Your Acquaintance is a 1927 Soviet short silent drama film directed by Lev Kuleshov and starring Aleksandra Khokhlova, Pyotr Galadzhev and Yuri Vasilchikov. Only a fragment of the film still survives.

The film's art direction was by Vasili Rakhals and Alexander Rodchenko.

Plot
The film is set in Moscow, during the years of the NEP. Journalist Khokhlova falls in love with Petrovsky, a responsible officer at an industrial plant. This infatuation has a negative impact on her work and the girl is fired. Meanwhile Petrovsky's wife returns. This situation reveals the true nature of the lover who is an egoist and a vulgarian. The girl is near suicide however the tragic denouement is prevented by Vasilchikov who has been in love with the journalist for a long time, a modest editor of the department "Working inventions."

Cast
 Aleksandra Khokhlova as Khokhlova - journalist 
 Pyotr Galadzhev as Secretary  
 Yuri Vasilchikov as Vasilchikov  
 Boris Ferdinandov as Petrovski  
 Anna Chekulaeva as Petrovsky's wife  
 Aleksandr Gromov as Typographer

References

Bibliography 
 Christie, Ian & Taylor, Richard. The Film Factory: Russian and Soviet Cinema in Documents 1896-1939. Routledge, 2012.

External links 
 

Films directed by Lev Kuleshov
1927 films
1927 short films
Soviet drama films
Russian drama films
Soviet silent feature films
1920s Russian-language films
Soviet black-and-white films
1927 drama films
Russian silent feature films
Russian black-and-white films
Silent drama films